Pokrovka is a rural locality (a village) in Krasnobashkirsky Selsoviet, Abzelilovsky District, Bashkortostan, Russia. The population was 226 as of 2010. There are 5 streets.

Geography 
Pokrovka is located 51 km northeast of Askarovo (the district's administrative centre) by road. Smelovsky is the nearest rural locality.

References 

Rural localities in Abzelilovsky District